The  2000 Edmonton Eskimos finished 2nd in the West Division with a 10–8–0–1 record, but lost the West Semi-Final to the eventual champion BC Lions.

Offseason

CFL Draft

Preseason

Schedule

Regular season

Season standings 
West Division

Season schedule

Playoffs 
Western Semi-Final

Awards and records

All-Star selections

Offence 
 OT – Bruce Beaton

Defence 
 LB – Terry Ray

Western All-Star selections

Offence 
 SB – Terry Vaughn
 C – Leo Groenewegen
 OT – Bruce Beaton

Defence 
 LB – Terry Ray
 DB – Ralph Staten

References

2000 Canadian Football League season by team
Edmonton Elks seasons